Orfelia fultoni or “dismalites” is a carnivorous species of fly larvae. It is the only bioluminescent species of dipteran fly found in North America. They produce the bluest light of any studied bioluminescent insect.

Discovery 
O. fultoni was discovered in the early 1940s near a spring in Glenville, North Carolina by B. B. Fulton. Fulton was performing field work when he noticed O. fultoni’s glowing blue light at night. He found the larvae concealed themselves in crevices during the day and crawled out at night on their webs to emit their light and feed. The O. fultoni had many similar characteristics as spiders including the use of their webs. Fulton was unable to identify the species, so he attempted to raise some of the larvae to maturity but was unsuccessful in his first attempt when his field work was discontinued and the larvae samples were exposed to heat and died. In a second attempt a year later, he found the larvae thrived when kept in a cool, moist environment. Once raised to maturity, he was able to identify them as an undescribed species of Platyura.

Habitat and ecology 
Orfelia fultoni occurs in the Appalachian Mountains and Cumberland Plateau, primarily in the states of Alabama, Georgia, North Carolina, Tennessee, and Virginia. The larvae of the species live in stream banks among moss and rock cavities, as well as in wet sandstone caves. They build sticky webs on moss, rotten wood, in cracks between rocks or on bare soil, and using their two bioluminescent lanterns as an attractant, capture flying prey in their webs. Once caught in the web, chemicals in the web paralyze the prey. The O. fultoni require a dark, still area where their lights can shine and where the wind doesn’t disturb their webs too much.

Dismals Canyon 
Orfelia fultoni has sometimes been referred to by the common name "dismalites", in consequence of their presence in Dismals Canyon, an 86 acre National Natural Landmark with a spring-fed creek and waterfall in northwest Alabama. The canyon is home to the largest population of O. fultoni anywhere in the United States. There are two peak seasons for the larvae in Alabama, the spring peak of late April through May, and the fall peak at the end of September through the first of October. They are visible throughout the year in smaller numbers. Dismals Canyon offers guided evening tours for visitors to see the dismalites.

Common features and life cycle 
Orfelia fultoni is a brownish larva measuring on average 10–20 mm long and 1–2 mm in diameter. It is distantly related to Arachnocampa, a genus of gnat species with a bioluminescent larval stage endemic to New Zealand and Australia. O. fultoni, however, has a morphologically and biochemically distinct bioluminescent system from the Arachnocampa which evolved independently. They use bilateral, anterior and posterior lanterns to emit their light as opposed to Arachnocampa which uses a single caudal lantern.

O. Fultoni has four stages in its life cycle. The first stage is the egg. The eggs are sticky brown balls which hang onto walls, overhangs and cave ceilings. The egg hatches into the larvae after approximately 7-9 days. The larvae stage is the most recognizable since it is at this stage O. fultoni emits its bioluminescent glow. The larvae stage usually lasts 6-9 months, depending on the availability of food. However, the glow worm can survive for long periods without eating. The larva is the only stage at which O. Fultoni feeds. It eats primarily midges, mayflies and caddisflies as well as the occasional adult glowworm. The third stage is the pupa. The larvae uses its sticky threads to create a protective barrier, then hangs in the middle of the barrier and encases itself in a pupal "skin". After approximately two weeks, it emerges as the adult gnat. The adult males will search for a female pupa to mate, after which it dies. The adult female will lay upwards of 130 eggs shortly after mating and then die.

References

External links 
 Information from official website of Dismals Canyon, a nature preserve where the species may be observed, including pictures.
Description of discovery of dismalites

Keroplatidae
Diptera of North America
Fauna of the Southeastern United States
Bioluminescent insects
Cave insects
Insects described in 1940
Taxa named by Elizabeth Gault Fisher